The Constellation Brands-Marvin Sands Performing Arts Center (CMAC), originally the Finger Lakes Performing Arts Center (FLPAC) is an outdoor concert venue in the Town of Hopewell, New York, just east of the City of Canandaigua, on the grounds of Finger Lakes Community College.

The amphitheater opened in 1983, with a mix of seating under the open air roof and on the hillside lawn looking down into the facility. It is the summer home of the Rochester Philharmonic Orchestra and is managed by ASM Global (the same firm that formerly managed the Blue Cross Arena in Rochester, New York).

Between the 2005 and 2006 seasons the amphitheater was rebuilt at a cost of about $13 million, to add 54 elevated luxury booths (seating capacity of 4 per booth), expand the general seating under the amphitheater roof from 2,600 to 5,000, and install new state of the art house lighting and sound systems.

The center is named after Constellation Brands, a total beverage alcohol company, and Marvin Sands, founder of the Canandaigua Brands winery. Marvin founded CMAC because he realized the important role that arts and culture play in the quality of the community. In recent years, CMAC has attracted sold-out shows and musical performers such as: Dave Matthews, Kenny Chesney, Sugarland, Lady Antebellum, Bob Dylan, Ringo Starr,  Mumford & Sons, Kid Rock, Snoop Dogg, The Allman Brothers, Luke Bryan, Hans Zimmer and Lynyrd Skynyrd.

Events

Board of Directors 
Board of Directors
 President and Executive Director – Virginia (Ginny) A. Clark
 Vice President – Sarah Axelrod
 Vice President – George Hamlin IV
 Vice President – Stency Wegman
 Secretary – Barbara LaVerdi
 Treasurer – Oksana (Sandy) Dominach

Directors:
 Richard Sands (chairman of the board)
 Virginia (Ginny) A. Clark
 Lauren Dixon
 Oksana (Sandy) Dominach
 Asher Flaum
 Bill Goodrich
 George W. Hamlin IV
 Tim Jones
 Mary Krause
 Diana Lauria
 James A. Locke III, Esq.
 Dr. Barbara Risser
 Ginny Ryan
 Philip H. Yawman

See also
List of contemporary amphitheatres

References

External links
Homepage

1983 establishments in New York (state)
Buildings and structures in Ontario County, New York
Tourist attractions in Ontario County, New York
Music venues in New York (state)